Sierra del Merendón is a mountain range extending on the eastern border of Guatemala and Honduras. Its south-western border is marked by the Lempa River valley, its northern border by the Motagua River valley. The mountain range has several different biomes and habitats, including cloud forests.

The Cusuco National Park (Parque Nacional El Cusuco) is located on the Honduran side and protects an area 23,440 hectares of temperate forest in the Merendón mountain range. The core zone is located at an altitude of 1,800 - 2,242 m. (15° 29.8' − 15° 32.1' N, 88° 13.0' − 88° 16.3' W).
Predominant forest habitats in the park are cloud forests (1,500 - 2,242 m), semi-arid pine forests on south-facing slopes (800 - 1,500 m), wet deciduous forests on north-facing slopes (500 - 1,500 m).

References

Mountain ranges of Guatemala
Geography of the Izabal Department
Geography of the Zacapa Department
Mountains of Honduras
Cortés Department
Santa Bárbara Department, Honduras
Mountain ranges of Central America